Wilmot (also Gilead) is a residential and business community in the village of Salem Lakes in southwestern Kenosha County, Wisconsin, United States. As of the 2010 census, prior to the incorporation into Salem Lakes, Wilmot was a census-designated place, with a population of 442. Since incorporation, Wilmot no longer has its own designated area for population statistics.

Gander Mountain, a sports/outdoors superstore, was founded in Wilmot, and was named for nearby Gander Mountain in neighboring Illinois.

Wilmot Union High School, Kenosha County Fair grounds, the Wilmot Raceway, and the Wilmot Mountain Ski Resort are located in Wilmot.

Notes

External links
Wilmot Raceway
Kenosha County Fair
Virtual tour images of Wilmot Mountain Ski Area
Wilmot Mountain Ski Area website

Former census-designated places in Wisconsin
Neighborhoods in Wisconsin